Patriarch Basil of Constantinople may refer to:

 Basil I of Constantinople, Ecumenical Patriarch in 970–974
 Basil II of Constantinople, Ecumenical Patriarch in 1183–1186
 Basil III of Constantinople, Ecumenical Patriarch in 1925–1929